Kamino is a rural locality (a village) in Zharkovsky District of Tver Oblast, Russia, located near the border with Belarus, just east of Lake Usodishche.

References

Rural localities in Zharkovsky District